Expenditures by Canadian corporations on research and development accounted for about 50% of all spending on scientific research and development in Canada in 2007.

In the corporate sector research and development tends to focus on the creation or invention of new products and services or more commonly the incremental improvement of existing products and services. A good example of the former would be the invention of the BlackBerry, by the Waterloo, Ontario-based company, Research in Motion, while an example of the latter would be the development of a new class of aircraft, the regional jet by Bombardier Aerospace of Montreal, Quebec.

It is rare for corporations to undertake what might be considered "pure" scientific research. In almost all cases the corporate bottom line is a paramount consideration and the payoff for such activity is not usually immediately evident. However it is true that there are times when the difference between the two is not at all clear, as was the case for example, with atomic research at Chalk River, Ontario, during World War II and in the post war years, which led to the development of the CANDU power reactor. More recently, research in the field of nanotechnology blurs the distinction as well. Is investigation into the principles of the manipulation of atoms science or engineering?

In 2006 total spending on scientific and industrial research in Canada amounted to C$28.067 billion or about 2 percent of GDP. In 2006 Canadian corporations spent C$14.858 billion on research and development, representing about half of all R&D spending in Canada and about one percent of Canada's GDP.

In 2007 Canadian corporations spent C$15.773 billion on research and development, again representing about half of all R&D expenditures in Canada and an amount equal to about one percent of the GDP.

Below is a list of the largest corporate R&D spenders in Canada ranked by size. Also described are sectorial R&D expenditures for the fiscal year 2006. A section that lists some important government R&D funding agencies is also included.

Largest Canadian corporate research and development spenders

Canada's ICT Top Corporate R&D Spenders 2005 Fiscal Year (in US$ millions)
Nortel Networks Corporation*       1,855.9     Comm/telecom equipment
Bell Canada                            1,436.0     Telecommunications services
ATI Technologies Inc.*                 372.5       Computer equipment
IBM Canada Ltd. (fs)                   283.1       Software and computer services
Ericsson Canada Inc. (fs)              165.9       Comm/telecom equipment
Alcatel Canada Inc. (fs)               160.1       Comm/telecom equipment
Cognos Incorporated*                   106.0       Software & computer services
Telus Corporation                      103.2       Telecommunications services
Research In Motion Limited*            101.2       Comm/telecom equipment
PMC Sierra, Ltd. (fs)                   85.1       Electronic parts and components
Zarlink Semiconductor Inc.*             65.2       Comm/telecom equipment
Open Text Corporation*                   65.1      Software & computer services
 CGI Group Inc.                           64.5      Software & computer services
Geac Computer Corporation Limited*+      57.9      Software & computer services
Hummingbird Ltd.*                        46.4      Software & computer services
Aastra Technologies Limited              43.2      Comm/telecom equipment
Motorola Canada Limited (fs)             42.1      Comm/telecom equipment
Mitel Networks Corporation*              41.4      Comm/telecom equipment
Source: RESEARCH Infosource Inc., Canada's Top 100 Corporate R&D List, 2006 (2/2007)
Canada's Life Sciences Top Corporate R&D Spenders 2005 Fiscal Year (in US$ Millions)
Apotex Inc.                         151.1
Pfizer Canada Inc. (fs)                 147.5
GlaxoSmithKline Inc. (fs)               111.8
Merck Frosst Canada Ltd. (fs)            96.6
Biovail Corporation*                     88.9
AstraZeneca Canada Inc. (fs)             79.8
Sanofi Pasteur Limited (fs)              76.6
QLT Inc.*                                74.6
MDS Inc.                                 71.8
Sanofi-aventis Canada Inc. (fs)          59.6
Vasogen Inc.                             59.1
Novartis Pharmaceuticals Canada Inc. (fs) 53.6
Wyeth Pharmaceuticals (fs)                 50.0
Neurochem Inc.                             41.7
Source: RESEARCH Infosource Inc., Canada's Top 100 Corporate R&D List, 2006 (2/2007)
Canada's Aerospace Top Corporate R&D Spenders 2005 Fiscal Year (in US$ Millions)
Pratt & Whitney Canada Corp. (fs)       389.5
Bombardier Inc.*                     175.0
CAE Inc.                                 88.8
Honeywell Canada (fs)                    76.0
MacDonald, Dettwiler and Associates Ltd. 40.4
Source: RESEARCH Infosource Inc., Canada's Top 100 Corporate R&D List, 2006 (2/2007)
Canada's Energy, Oil and Gas Top Corporate R&D Spenders 2005 Fiscal Year (in US$ Millions)
Atomic Energy of Canada Limited      218.0
Suncor Energy Inc.                       89.1
EnCana Corporation*                      80.0
Ballard Power Systems Inc.*              75.5
Imperial Oil Limited                     56.1
Syncrude Canada Ltd.                     36.6
Source: RESEARCH Infosource Inc., Canada's Top 100 Corporate R&D List, 2006 (2/2007)

Industrial research and development expenditures by sector

 Canadian Gross Expenditure on R&D (GERD) by Performing Sectors - 2006 Estimates
 C$ Millions
 Business Enterprises   14,850,    52.4%
 Higher Education   10,890,    38.4%
 Federal Government   2,145,    7.6%
 Provincial Government   345,    1.2%
 Provincial Research Organizations   127,    0.4%
 Total   28,357,    100.0%
 Source: Statistics Canada, Science Statistics September 2006 (2/2007)
 Canadian Industrial Intramural R&D Expenditures, Selected Industries - 2006 Estimates
 C$ Millions
 Machinery   488
 Motor Vehicles and parts   537
 Wholesale Trade   767
 Semiconductor & other electronic components   869
 Aerospace products and parts   912
 Computer system design & related services   1,056
 Scientific research & development services   1,142
 Pharmaceutical & medicine   1,293
 Information & cultural industries   1,518
 Communication Equipment   1,580
 Source: Statistics Canada, Science Statistics September 2006 (2/2007)
 Canadian Industrial Intramural R&D Expenditures in Six Sub-group - 2006 Estimates
 Agriculture, forestry, fishing and hunting       80
 Mining and oil and gas extraction       261
 Utilities       197
 Construction       46
 Manufacturing       8,273
 Communication Equipment   1,580
 Pharmaceutical & medicine   1,293
 Aerospace products and parts   912
 Semiconductor & other electronic components   869
 Motor Vehicles and parts   537
 Machinery   488
 Paper   468
 Navig., measuring, medical & control instruments   345
 Other manufacturing industries   1,781
Services       5,993
 Information and cultural industries   1,518
 Scientific research & development services   1,142
 Computer system design & related services   1,056
 Wholesale Trade   767
 Architectural, engineering and real estates   442
 Health care and social assistance   364
 Finance, insurance and real estate   356
 All other services   348
Total All Industries       14,850
Source: Statistics Canada, Science Statistics August 2006 (2/2007)

Government industrial research and development funding agencies

 Revenue Canada - Ottawa, Ontario
 Scientific Research and Experimental Development Programme,
 Federal government tax advantages for industrial research and development.
National Research Council of Canada - Ottawa, Ontario
 NRC Industrial Research Assistance Program (NRC-IRAP)- Ottawa (Montreal Road Campus), Ontario and NRC-IRAP across Canada,
 Ontario Ministry of Research and Innovation - Toronto, Ontario
 Commercialization and Funding Organizations
 Early Researcher Awards
 The Health Technology Exchange
 Innovation Demonstration Fund
 International Strategic Opportunities Program
 Ontario Commercialization Investment Funds
 Ontario Fuel Cell Innovation Programme
 Ontario Research Commercialization Program
 Premiers Discovery Awards
 Government of Newfoundland and Labrador
The Research and Development Corporation

See also

 Canadian government scientific research organizations
 Canadian university scientific research organizations
 Science and technology in Canada

References

 Canadian government public web site: Innovation in Canada : https://web.archive.org/web/20081108044139/http://innovation.gc.ca/
 Statistics Canada, Domestic spending on research and development (GERD)
 https://web.archive.org/web/20080326180156/http://www40.statcan.ca/l01/cst01/scte03.htm
 Research Infosource Inc., Canada's Top 100 Corporate R&D List, 2006 (2/2007)

Research and development in Canada